Sant’Ippolito is a church in Nomentano, Viale delle Provincie, Rome, Italy.

History
It was ordered by Pope Pius XI and built between 1933-34 by architect Clemente Busiri Vici; He was blessed 23 December 1934 and first start there was celebrated on Christmas Eve; was solemnly consecrated on 4 October 1938. The church was dedicated to St. Hippolytus Martyr, whose catacombs are located nearby.

The church is home parish, established on 26 May 1935 with the decree of the Cardinal Vicar Francesco Marchetti Selvaggiani Boni Pastoris vestigiis; initially entrusted to the Friars Minor Capuchin since 1985 it is run by the diocesan clergy. Since 14 February 2015, it is the seat of the cardinal title of S. Hippolytii, and its Protector is Cardinal John Atcherley Dew.

References
 Sant'Ippolito

Titular churches
Rome Q. V Nomentano
Roman Catholic churches completed in 1934
1934 establishments in Italy
20th-century Roman Catholic church buildings in Italy